Saeid Mohammadpour Karkaragh (pronounced Sigh-eed Moha-mad-pour-car-kara, born March 3, 1993, in Ardabil, Iran) is an Iranian weightlifter.

Saeid finished fifth in the 2012 London Olympics, but in 2016 after retesting the samples of 2012 Summer Olympics athletes, it was discovered that the top four in his weight class had committed doping. Therefore, he became the gold medalist and Olympic Champion in 94 kg weightlifting category. He is also a bronze medalist at the 2011 World Championships in Paris.

Major results

References

External links
 
 
 
 

1993 births
Living people
World Weightlifting Championships medalists
Iranian male weightlifters
Olympic weightlifters of Iran
Weightlifters at the 2012 Summer Olympics
People from Ardabil
Medalists at the 2012 Summer Olympics
Olympic medalists in weightlifting
Olympic gold medalists for Iran
20th-century Iranian people
21st-century Iranian people